A fashion editor is a person that supervises the process of creating, developing and presenting content for the fashion department of a magazine, Web site, newspaper or television program.

The work of a fashion editor can be quite varied and may hold several responsibilities. Typical work includes supervising other editors and writers, writing or editing articles themselves, formulating and styling fashion photo shoots, choosing photos for publication, choosing fashion items and trends for publication, researching trends in the fashion industry and networking with industry professionals including photographers, designers and public relations professionals.

Notable fashion editors
This is a list of notable fashion editors.

See also 

Fashion magazine

References

 
Fashion occupations
Mass media occupations
Types of editors